Trevor Jimenez is a Canadian animator. He is most noted for his 2018 film Weekends, which was a nominee for the Academy Award for Best Animated Short Film at the 91st Academy Awards.

The film, a depiction of his real-life childhood experiences as the son of divorced parents who spent the week with his mother in Hamilton, Ontario and the weekends with his father in Toronto, was produced through the co-op program at Pixar, which permits employees to use company resources to make their own independent short films. Jimenez has worked as a story artist on films such as Ice Age: Dawn of the Dinosaurs, Rio, The Lorax, Finding Dory, Coco and Soul.

References

External links

Annie Award winners
Canadian animated film directors
Artists from Hamilton, Ontario
Film directors from Ontario
Living people
Year of birth missing (living people)
Blue Sky Studios people
Illumination (company) people
Pixar people